Tetschner or Tetzschner (the Anglicized spelling Tetzchner is also used by some) is a German surname, which means "from Tetschen" (that is, modern Děčín) in northern Bohemia. The surname is mostly found in Central Europe including Germany, but also in Denmark and Norway.

People
Michael Tetzschner, Norwegian conservative politician
Jon Stephenson von Tetzchner, Norwegian-Icelandic Internet entrepreneur
Stephen von Tetzchner, Norwegian child psychologist

References

German-language surnames